Ghulam Azam (7 November 192223 October 2014) was a Bangladeshi Islamist politician. He was the former leader of Bangladesh Jamaat-e-Islami, the largest Islamist political party in Bangladesh.

Azam was arrested by the Government of Bangladesh on 11 January 2012 after he was found guilty in war crimes charges during the 1971 Bangladesh Liberation War.

He founded the Jamaat-e-Islami Bangladesh for East Pakistan during 1971 unrest that was aimed at to oppose the independence of Bangladesh. He led the party until 2000.

On 15 July 2013, a Bangladeshi special tribunal, the International Crimes Tribunal found him guilty of war crimes such as conspiring, planning, incitement to and complicity in committing genocide and was sentenced to 90 years in jail. The tribunal stated that Azam deserved capital punishment for his activity during Liberation war of Bangladesh, but was given a lenient punishment of imprisonment because of his age and poor health condition. The trial was criticized by several international observers, including Human Rights Watch and Amnesty International. Human Rights Watch, which was initially supportive of a trial subsequently criticized "strong judicial bias towards the prosecution and grave violations of due process rights", calling the trial process deeply flawed and unable to meet international fair trial standards. Notably, it was at the center of the 2012 ICT Skype controversy.

As a leader of the Jamaat-e-Islami, he led the formation of the Shanti Committees that were formed at the time of the Liberation War alongside other pro-Pakistan Bengali leaders. Azam was accused of forming paramilitary groups for the Pakistani Army, including Razakars, and Al-Badr. These militias opposed the Mukti Bahini members who fought for the independence of Bangladesh, and also stand accused of war crimes.
Azam's citizenship was cancelled by the Bangladeshi Government because of playing an opposition role during the Bangladesh liberation war.

He lived informally in Bangladesh from 1978 to 1994 without any authorised Bangladeshi visa. His citizenship was then reinstated by the Supreme Court of Bangladesh.

Azam was arrested on 11 January 2012 by the International Crimes Tribunal in Bangladesh on the charges of committing war crimes during the Bangladesh liberation war. The tribunal rejected the plea of bail after noting that there were formal charges against Azam of which it had taken cognisance.

He was 91 when he died of a stroke on 23 October 2014 at BSMMU.

Thousands of people attended his funeral prayers that were televised and held at the National Mosque of Bangladesh Baitul Mukarram.

Early life and education
Azam was born on 7 November 1922 in his maternal home, the Shah Saheb Bari of Lakshmibazar, Dacca, Bengal Presidency. He was the eldest son of Ghulam Kabir and Sayeda Ashrafunnisa. His father was a mawlana who hailed from the village of Birgaon in Nabinagar, Brahmanbaria, Tipperah District. Azam's education began at the local madrasa in Birgaon and then completed his secondary school education in Dhaka. After that, he enrolled at Dacca University where he completed BA and MA degrees in Political science.

Early political career

University

While studying at the University of Dhaka, Azam became active in student's politics and was elected as the General Secretary of the Dhaka University Central Students' Union (DUCSU) for the two consecutive years between 1947 and 1949. As a General Secretary of the DUCSU, Azam in 1947 submitted a memorandum on the union's behalf to the Prime Minister of Pakistan Liaquat Ali Khan, demanding that Bengali be made a state language along with Urdu. At that time, Bangladesh was administered by the Pakistan. "Bangla was a wrong decision with regard to the establishment of Pakistan since Urdu was widely used and all Muslims of the Indian subcontinent were Urdu speakers."

Jamaat-e-Islami

In 1950, Azam left Dhaka to teach political science at the Government Carmichael College in Rangpur. During this time, he was influenced by the writings of Abul Ala Maududi and he joined Maududi's party Jamaat-e-Islami Pakistan in 1954, and was later elected as the Secretary General of Jamaat-e-Islami's East Pakistan branch.

In 1964, the government of Ayub Khan banned Jamaat-e-Islami and its leaders, including Azam, and imprisoned them for eight months without trials. He played a prominent role as the general secretary of the Pakistan Democratic Movement formed in 1967 and later, he was elected as the member of Democratic Action Committee in 1969 to transform the anti-Ayub movement into a
popular uprising. In 1969, he became the Ameer of the Jamaat in East Pakistan. He and other opposition leaders including future President of Bangladesh Sheikh Mujibur Rahman took part in the Round Table Conference held in Rawalpindi in 1969 to solve the prevailing political impasse in Pakistan. On 13 March 1969, Khan announced his acceptance of their two fundamental demands of parliamentary government and direct elections.

In the runup to the 1970 Pakistani general election, Azam together with leaders of a number of other parties in East Pakistan (including the Pakistan Democratic Party, National Awami Party, Jamiat Ulema-e-Islam and the Pakistan National League) protested at the Awami League approach to electioneering for, accusing them of breaking up public meetings, physical attacks on political opponents and the looting and destruction of party offices. During 1970, while Azam was the head of Jamaat-e-Islami East Pakistan, a number of political rallies, including rallies of Jamaat-e-Islami, were attacked by armed mobs alleged to be incited by the Awami League.

Bangladesh Liberation War

Activities during 1971 War
During the Bangladesh Liberation War, Azam took a political stance in support of unified Pakistan, and repeatedly denounced Awami League and Mukti Bahini secessionists, whose declared aim after 26 March 1971 became the establishment of an independent state of Bangladesh in place of East Pakistan. Excerpts from Azam's speeches after 25 March 1971 used to be published in the spokespaper of the Bangladesh Jamaat-e-Islami named The Daily Sangram. On 20 June 1971, Azam reaffirmed his support for the Pakistani army by citing that 'the army has eradicated nearly all criminals of East Pakistan'.

During the war of 1971, it was alleged that Azam played a central role in the formation of East Pakistan Central Peace Committee on 11 April 1971, which declared the independence movement a conspiracy planned by India. It was also alleged that Azam was one of the founding members of this organization. The Peace Committee members were drawn from Azam's Jamaat-e-Islami, the Muslim League and Biharis. The Peace Committee served as a front for the army, informing on the civil administration as well as the general public. They were also in charge of confiscating and redistribution of shops and lands from Hindu and pro-independence Bengali activists, mainly relatives and friends of Mukti Bahini fighters. The Shanti Committee has also been alleged to have recruited Razakars. The first recruits included 96 Jamaat party members, who started training in an Ansar camp at Shahjahan Ali Road, Khulna. During Azam's leadership of Jamaat-e-Islami, Ashraf Hossain, a leader of Jamaat's student wing Islami Chhatra Sangha, created the Al-Badr militia in Jamalpur district on 22 April 1971. On 12 April 1971, Azam and Matiur Rahman Nizami led demonstrations denouncing the independence movement as an Indian conspiracy.

During the war, Azam travelled to West Pakistan at the time to consult the Pakistani leaders. He declared that his party (Jamaat) is trying its best to curb the activities of pro-independence "Miscreants". He took part in meetings with General Yahya Khan, the military dictator of Pakistan, and other military leaders, to organize the campaign against Bangladeshi independence.

On 12 August 1971, Azam declared in a statement published in the Daily Sangram that "the supporters of the so-called Bangladesh Movement are the enemies of Islam, Pakistan, and Muslims". He also called for an all out war against India. He called for the annexation of Assam.

Azam was also alleged as the prime standard-bearer who presented the blueprint of the killing of the intellectuals during a meeting with Rao Farman Ali in early September 1971. According to this blue print, Pakistani Army and the local collaborators executed the killing of the Bengali intellectuals on 14 December 1971.

Allegations

On 20 June 1971, Azam declared in Lahore that the Hindu minority in East Pakistan, under the leadership of Sheikh Mujibur Rahman, are conspiring to secede from Pakistan. On 12 August 1971, Azam declared in a statement published in the Daily Sangram that "the supporters of the Bangladesh Movement are the enemies of Islam, Pakistan, and Muslims". On his side, Azam denied all such accusations and challenged by giving reasons to justify them. However, he later admitted that he was on the list of collaborators of the Pakistani army, but denied he was a war criminal.

The military junta of General Yahya Khan decided to call an election in an effort to legitimize themselves. On 12 October 1971, Yahya Khan declared that an election will be held from 25 November to 9 December. Azam decided to take part in this election. On 15 October, the Pakistani government suddenly declared that 15 candidates were elected without any competition. According to the declaration of 2 November, as many as 53 candidates were elected without any competition. In this election Jamaat won 14 of the uncontested seats.

Former advisor to the Caretaker government of Bangladesh, human rights activist and witness for the prosecution Sultana Kamal said- "In brutality, Ghulam Azam is synonymous with German ruler Hitler who had influential role in implementation and execution of genocide and ethnic cleansing". In response to this statement, the defense counsel pointed out that the comparison was a fallacy and "fake with malicious intention" as Hitler held state power, which Azam did not and that in 1971 General Tikka Khan and Yahya Khan held state power. Prosecutor of ICT Zead-Al-Malum said- "He was the one making all the decisions, why would he need to be on any committee? Being Hitler was enough for Hitler in World War II".

Leader of Jamaat-e-Islami Bangladesh
The government of newly independent Bangladesh, banned Bangladesh Jamaat-e-Islami and cancelled Azam's citizenship for playing alleged role during the Bangladesh Liberation War. Azam lived in exile in London until he was allowed to return home in 1978.
Following the independence of Bangladesh, he migrated to Pakistan (previously West Pakistan) as he opposed the independence and continued to be a Pakistani citizen even after 1971 (until 1994)

Jamaat's rehabilitation began when Ziaur Rahman became president after a coup in 1975 and lifted the previous ban on religious parties. In 1977, Zia removed secularism in the constitution, replacing it with Islamic ideals, further clearing the way for Jamaat-e-Islami to return to political participation. In 1978, Azam returned to Bangladesh on a Pakistani passport with a temporary visa, and stayed as a Pakistani national until 1994 even after his visa expired; he refused to leave the country and continued to live in Bangladesh. His stay was however unwelcome in Bangladesh, and he was beaten by an angry mob at the footsteps of the Baitul Mukarram mosque while attending a funeral in 1981.

In the 1980s, Azam was particularly critical of the military rule of General Ershad after he seized power in a bloodless coup in 1982 and Jamaat-e-Islami took part in demonstrations and strikes as well as other opposition parties such as the Awami League and the Bangladesh Nationalist Party (BNP). He proposed a caretaker government system to facilitate free and fair elections, which was adopted in 1990. In the 1991 Bangladeshi general election, Jamaat-e-Islami won 18 seats and its support allowed the BNP to form a government.

During this time, he acted unofficially as the Ameer (leader) of Jamaat-e-Islami until 1991, when he was officially elected to the post. This led the government arresting him and an unofficial court called "The People's Court" was established by the civilians such as Jahanara Imam to try alleged war criminals and anti-independence activists. Imam held a symbolic trial of Azam where thousands of people gathered and gave the verdict that Azam's offences committed during the Liberation War deserve capital punishment. In 1994, he fought a lengthy legal battle which resulted in the Supreme Court of Bangladesh ruling in his favor and restoring his nationality.

In the 1996 election, Jamaat won only three seats, and most of their candidates lost their deposits. Azam announced his retirement from active politics in late 2000. He was succeeded by Motiur Rahman Nizami.

War crimes trial

Arrest and incarceration
On 11 January 2012, Azam was arrested on charges of committing crimes against humanity and peace, genocide and war crimes in 1971 by the International Crimes Tribunal. His petition for bail was rejected by the ICT, and he was sent to Dhaka Central Jail. However, three hours later he was taken to the Bangabandhu Sheikh Mujib Medical University (BSMMU) hospital for a medical check-up because of his aging.
According to The Daily Star, Azam was allowed to remain in a hospital prison cell despite being declared fit for trial by a medical team on 15 January. The same paper later acknowledged that he had been placed there because to his "ailing condition".

Azam's health was deteriorating rapidly since being imprisoned. His wife, Syeda Afifa Azam reported in several newspapers as being shocked about Azam's treatment and stated that he was very weak and had lost 3 kilograms in a month due to malnutrition. She described his treatment as "a gross violation of human rights" even though he was kept in a hospital prison cell.

Azam's wife complained that he had been denied proper family visits and access to books, saying that this amounted to "mental torture". The Daily Star reported that Azam's wife and his counsels were allowed to meet him on 18 February.
On 25 February 2012, The Daily Star further reported that Azam's nephew was denied a visit shortly before he was about to enter hospital prison. This was despite the application for the visit being first approved.

Islamic activists from different countries expressed their concerns for Mr. Azam. The International Union of Muslim Scholars, chaired by Yusuf al-Qaradawi called the arrest "disgraceful", and called on the Bangladesh government to release him immediately, stating that "the charge of Professor Ghulam Azam and his fellow scholars and Islamic activists of committing war crimes more than forty years ago is irrational and cannot be accepted".

The judicial process under which Azam was on trial was criticized by international organizations such as Human Rights Watch and Amnesty International.
So far, the ICT has sentenced two of the accused to death and another one to life imprisonment.

Verdict
Azam was convicted of war crimes during the Bangladesh Liberation War by the controversial International Crimes Tribunal-1 of Bangladesh. The charges against Azam were torturing and the killings of a police officer "Shiru Mia" and three other civilians. He was found guilty on all five charges and was sentenced to 90 years in prison. The judges unanimously agreed that Azam deserved capital punishment but was given a lenient punishment because of his aging and poor health condition.

In a press release, Jamaat's Acting Secretary General "Rafiqul Islam" rejected the International Crimes Tribunal's verdict against Azam by stating his conviction "nothing but a reflection of what AL-led 14-party alliance leaders had said against him Ghulam Azam in different meetings". A popular newspaper Daily Amardesh, the publication of which is banned by the ruling Bangladesh Awami League since 2013, reported that the evidence presented before the court against Ghulam Azam consisted of newspaper clippings published during 1971."

Death
Ghulam Azam died after suffering a stroke on 23 October 2014 at 10:10 PM at BSMMU while serving jail sentences for crimes against humanity during Bangladesh Liberation War. His death was reported by Abdul Majid Bhuiyan, director of BSMMU. Ghulam Azam was put on life support system at 8 PM. He was also suffering from kidney ailments.
Azam was buried at his family graveyard at Moghbazar, Dhaka on 25 October.
His namaz-e-janaza (Islamic funeral prayer) was held at Bangladesh's national mosque Baitul Mokarram, which is still considered one of the largest gatherings at any funeral prayers. Different quarters of the country protested against taking Azam's body to the national mosque because of his war crimes conviction and his opposition role to the independence of the country.

References

1922 births
2014 deaths
Bangladesh Liberation War
Jamaat-e-Islami Pakistan politicians
Pakistani lobbyists
Bangladesh Jamaat-e-Islami politicians
Bangladeshi people convicted of crimes against humanity
Bangladeshi people convicted of war crimes
Pakistani emigrants to Bangladesh
People from Brahmanbaria district
People convicted of incitement to genocide
1971 Bangladesh genocide perpetrators
Prisoners who died in Bangladeshi detention